The Samseonghyeol (Korean: 삼성혈 / English: "three clans' holes") is an archeological, historical and cultural landmark in Jeju City, Jeju-do, South Korea.

Information 

The site is located in the city center of Jeju City and consists mainly of a shrine and a depression from which, according to legend, three demigods emerged from the ground to become the founding fathers of the ancient kingdom of Tamna and its people. Three families (or clans) bear the name and claim descendance from those deities.
 Go Eulna
 Ryang Eulna
 Bu Eulna

External links 
 Samseonghyeol (English)

Geography of Jeju Province
Jeju mythology
Tourist attractions in Jeju Province
Tamna